This is the list of teams and cyclists in the 2008 Giro d'Italia.

Key: DNS = Did Not Start stage; DNF = Did Not Finish stage; DSQ = Disqualified from stage; HD = Hors Delai: outside time limit for stage.

External links 

cyclingnews.com

2008 Giro d'Italia
2008